The Summit League men's basketball tournament is the post-season tournament for  NCAA Division I conference Summit League.  The winner of the tournament receives the Summit League's automatic bid into the NCAA Men's Division I Basketball Championship.  The tournament was first played in 1984, when the league was known as the Association of Mid-Continent Universities (AMCU).  The league was also known as the Mid-Continent Conference from 1989 to 2007, after which it was renamed to The Summit League.

Format
Currently, all 10 men's basketball teams in the Summit League receive a berth in the conference tournament (barring NCAA sanctions). Before the 2022-23 season, only the top 8 conference teams (by conference record) made the tournament. After the 18-game conference season, teams are seeded by conference record with the following tie-breakers:
 Head-to-head competition
 Winning percentage vs. ranked conference teams (starting with #1 and moving down until the tie is broken)
 Ratings Percentage Index
 Coin flip

Tournament champions

Performance by school

 Teams in bold are currently in the Summit League. Oral Roberts left for the Southland Conference after the 2011–12 season, but returned for 2014–15.
 Among current Summit League members, North Dakota, Omaha, and South Dakota have reached the tournament final but failed to win the championship, and Denver and Kansas City have yet to advance to the tournament final. Kansas City, which rejoined in 2020–21, had competed under its academic identity of UMKC during its previous Summit tenure (1994–95 to 2012–13).

Television coverage

See also
 Summit League women's basketball tournament

References

 
Recurring sporting events established in 1984
1984 establishments in the United States